Celebrity Dish also known as TV Guide's Celebrity Dish was a 2000 60 minute American Food Network Television cooking show which was hosted by Mark McEwen which premiered on June 22, 2000.

Description

As the name implies, this series of TV specials featured television and movie celebrities cooking their favorite foods.

Yasmine Bleeth appeared in Episode SPCDSP02, TV Guide Celebrity Dish II, the 2nd edition of the series.  John Spencer, Nancy O'Dell and Jack Wagner also were scheduled to appear on the 2nd edition of the specials. 

The first edition of TV Guide's Celebrity Dish showcased Paul Sorvino, Michael Boatman, Catherine Hicks and Susan Lucci.

TV Guide's Celebrity Dish: Holiday Entertaining was another special hosted by McEwan which revealed holiday entertainment tips from celebrities like Jane Seymour, Julia Sweeney and Ed Bradley.

Cast

Mark McEwen .... Host
Betsy Foldes-narrator
Yasmine Bleeth	.... 	Herself
Michael Boatman	.... 	Himself
Ed Bradley	.... 	Himself
Michael Chiklis	.... 	Himself
Whoopi Goldberg	.... 	Herself
Patricia Heaton	.... 	Herself
Catherine Hicks	.... 	Herself
Susan Lucci	.... 	Herself
Nancy O'Dell	.... 	Herself
Jane Seymour	.... 	Herself
Paul Sorvino	.... 	Himself
John Spencer	.... 	Himself
Julia Sweeney	.... 	Herself
Jack Wagner	.... 	Himself

Production credits

Paul Shavelson (Director)
Janice Kaplan (Executive Producer)
Jeanne Wolf (Executive Producer)
Paul Shavelson (Producer)
Alicia M. Tripi {Department Head Hair Stylist and Makeup Artist}
Doug Masla (Music Composer)
Food Network (Production Company)

External links
 
 

Food Network original programming
2000 American television series debuts
2001 American television series endings